John Hynes may refer to:

John Hynes (footballer) (born 1979), former Australian rules football player
John Hynes (ice hockey) (born 1975), ice hockey coach
John Hynes (politician) (1897–1970), Massachusetts politician 
John Hynes (priest), professor of archaeology and president of University College
Jack Hynes (soccer) (1920–2013), Scottish-born American soccer forward 
John Hynes (rugby league), Australian rugby league footballer

See also
Jack Hynes (disambiguation)
Hynes Convention Center, the John B. Hynes Veterans Memorial Convention Center located in Boston, Massachusetts